The third season of The O.C. commenced airing in the United States on September 8, 2005, concluded on May 18, 2006, and consisted of 25 episodes. The first ten episodes of season three aired Thursdays at 8:00 p.m. ET in the US on FOX, a terrestrial television network; however, from January 12, 2006, onwards, The O.C. was shifted to a later time of Thursdays at 9:00 p.m. ET.

The season was released on DVD as a seven disc boxed set under the title The O.C.: The Complete Third Season on October 24, 2006, by Warner Bros. Home Video. 

Season three was also broadcast outside of the United States. In Canada, the season was simulcast on the terrestrial network CTV Television Network. It was broadcast on Network Ten on Tuesdays at 8:30 p.m. (local time) in Australia, and premiered several months after it did in the US. In New Zealand the season started February 11, 2006 on TV NZ. It premiered in the United Kingdom on January 10, 2006, on the digital terrestrial channel E4, airing Tuesdays at 9:00 p.m. GMT. The episodes were rebroadcast the following week on the analogue Channel 4, E4's parent channel, on Sundays at 1:50 p.m. GMT.

Synopsis 
Picking up from season two, this seàson continues to follow the characters' lives in the wealthy community of Newport Beach, Orange County, California, with the main characters entering their senior year of high school.  Ryan's savior complex causes trouble, and Seth's lies poses problems in his relationship with Summer. Meanwhile, Kirsten attends rehab in an attempt to put her life back together, while her husband Sandy assumes leadership of the Newport Group after Caleb's death and finds himself the heir-apparent to a legacy of scandal, and Marissa spirals out of control after her younger sister Kaitlin causes trouble on her return home from boarding school.

Cast and characters

Regular
 Peter Gallagher as Sandy Cohen (25 episodes)
 Kelly Rowan as Kirsten Cohen (25 episodes)
 Benjamin McKenzie as Ryan Atwood (25 episodes)
 Mischa Barton as Marissa Cooper (25 episodes)
 Adam Brody as Seth Cohen (25 episodes)
 Melinda Clarke as Julie Cooper (24 episodes)
 Rachel Bilson as Summer Roberts (25 episodes)

Recurring
 Autumn Reeser as Taylor Townsend (15 episodes)
 Michael Nouri as Neil Roberts (14 episodes)
 Cam Gigandet as Kevin Volchok (13 episodes)
 Jeff Hephner as Matt Ramsey (13 episodes)
 Ryan Donowho as Johnny Harper (11 episodes)
 Johnny Lewis as Chili Sanders (9 episodes)
 Jeri Ryan as Charlotte Morgan (7 episodes)
 Willa Holland as Kaitlin Cooper (6 episodes)
 Nikki Reed as Sadie Campbell (6 episodes)
 Paula Trickey as Veronica Townsend (5 episodes)
 Eric Mabius as Dean Jack Hess (4 episodes)
 Lisa Rotondi as Gwen Harper (4 episodes)
 Shaun Duke as Henry Griffin (4 episodes)
 Morena Baccarin as Maya Griffin (3 episodes)
 Navi Rawat as Theresa Diaz (3 episodes)
 Daphne Ashbrook as Dawn Atwood (3 episodes)
 Rosalind Chao as Dr Kim (3 episodes)

Special Guest starring
 Samaire Armstrong as Anna Stern (2 episodes)
 Logan Marshall-Green as Trey Atwood (1 episode)
 Nikki Griffin as Jess Sathers (1 episode)

Episodes

Crew
The season was produced by Warner Bros. Television and Wonderland Sound and Vision. The executive producers were series creator Josh Schwartz, McG, a co-founder of Wonderland, and Bob DeLaurentis. Stephanie Savage, the other co-founder of Wonderland, served as co-executive producer, whilst Ian Toynton served as supervising producer. The staff writers were Schwartz, Savage, DeLaurentis, John Stephens, J.J. Philbin and Mike Kelley. The regular directors throughout the season were Toynton, Michael Lange, Michael Fresco, Norman Buckley and Tony Wharmby.

Cast

The third season had star billing for seven major roles. Mischa Barton as Marissa, Rachel Bilson as Summer, Adam Brody as Seth, Melinda Clarke as Julie, Peter Gallagher as Sandy, Benjamin McKenzie as Ryan, and Kelly Rowan as Kirsten all returned to the main cast. Former main cast member Alan Dale did not return due to his character, Caleb, dying at the end of the second season, while Tate Donovan, as Jimmy Cooper, returned only in a recurring role, and then only for the first three episodes of the season.

Logan Marshall-Green returned for the season premiere, portraying Trey Atwood, comatosed as a result of the shooting in the second-season finale. Additionally Navi Rawat, Samaire Armstrong, Daphne Ashbrook and Nikki Griffin all made brief returns to guest star as Theresa Diaz, Anna Stern, Dawn Atwood, and Jess Sathers, respectively. Willa Holland took over from Shailene Woodley in portraying Marissa's younger sister Kaitlin, who returns to the show after being away at boarding school last year. Cast member Michael Nouri continued as Summer's dad, Dr. Neil Roberts, who became a larger part of the series. Other actors to leave the series were Nicholas Gonzalez (D.J.), Michael Cassidy (Zach), Shannon Lucio (Lindsay), Olivia Wilde (Alex), Billy Campbell (Carter), Kim Delaney (Rebecca), Johnny Messner (Lance), Kathleen York (Renee), and Marguerite Moreau (Reed).

The season introduced a number of new students to the show. Additions to the cast included Autumn Reeser, Cam Gigandet, Ryan Donowho and Johnny Lewis, as new social chair Taylor Townsend, rival surfers Kevin Volchok and Johnny Harper, and Johnny's best friend Chili. Jeri Ryan and Jeff Hephner also joined the cast to portray new adult characters Charlotte Morgan, a mysterious woman Kirsten befriends in rehab, and Matt Ramsey, an overzealous business partner working at the Newport Group. New guest stars in recurring roles included Paula Trickey as Taylor's mother, Veronica Townsend; Erin Foster as a Newport Union student called Heather; Kayla Ewell and Nikki Reed as Johnny's girlfriend, Casey, and cousin Sadie; Eric Mabius as new Dean of Discipline, Jack Hess; Shaun Duke as Henry Griffin, head of the board at Newport Hospital; and Morena Baccarin as Griffin's daughter Maya. This is the final season for original cast member Mischa Barton who played Marissa Cooper; Marissa tragically dies in a car accident in the season finale.

Reception
Season three was widely regarded by both fans and critics as the worst season of The O.C. The season premiere attracted 7.5 million viewers, but average viewing figures decreased twenty percent from the previous season to 5.6 million. The first half of the season averaged 6.3 million viewers, representing a substantial decrease in the show's popularity. However Marcy Ross, head of current programming at FOX said that the "ratings are perfectly fine and acceptable".
After the eventual cancellation of the show, Schwartz admitted that "the whole first half of the third season was a total mess".

The third season was nominated for five Teen Choice Awards and won four of them, including "Choice Drama/Action Adventure Show" and "Choice Actor: Drama/Action Adventure", which Adam Brody won for the third consecutive year. IGN faulted a season which, in their opinion, had "far too much time and too many episodes spent with the less than beloved character Johnny". IGN also noted that "Kirsten and Sandy both suffered from unsatisfying stories", and that the departure of character Caleb Nichol had been a mistake "as he had been a great character to bounce off both of the elder Cohens". In September 2007, Schwartz admitted in an interview for New York that the show "went down the wrong road" with Johnny. The season did, however, receive some praise. The new character Taylor Townsend was stated as being "played to perfection by Autumn Reeser" and her character was described as "one of the greatest elements of The O.C." Jeffrey Robinson of DVD Talk described the storylines as "very intelligent and also incorporate a great deal of humor to keep your interest". 

USA Today critic Robert Bianco said that the season premiere was "as dreary and ridiculous as any episode the show ever gave us",
but the season finale was commended by IGN's Eric Goldman for killing off main character Marissa Cooper. Goldman said that "the episode documenting her demise was a fairly strong one" and that the following season "would really pay off this shocking twist". Despite not being the final season it was also noted that the graduation of characters gave "the show a feeling of ending".

DVD release
The DVD release of season three was released by Warner Bros. in the US on October 24, 2006 after it had completed broadcast on television. As well as every episode from the season, the DVD release features bonus material including a gag reel, featurettes, and the making of a music video by The Subways.

References

General

Specific

External links
 Episode guide at Warner Bros.' The OC Insider
 
 The O.C. music guide

Season 3
2005 American television seasons
2006 American television seasons